Beris clavipes, the scarce orange legionnaire, is a European (Northern and central Europe down into France, towards north to middle Sweden) species of soldier fly.

Description
Length 6—6.3 mm.
Male. Eyes hairy, facets in about the upper two thirds larger than below. Antennae black, the first joint longer than the 
second. Thorax black with blackish pubescence. Abdomen orange with brownish pubescence, which is long at the margin: the 
base brown; on the second to sixth segment the transverse, impressed line just in front of the hind margin is more or less 
distinctly blackish: the seventh segment is not brown. Venter yellowish red. Legs yellow; the apical half of the anterior 
tibiae, the hind tibiae at the tips and all tarsi blackish:the hind metatarsi much thickened. Legs with fine, yellowish 
pubescence. Wings considerably brownish and more so than in vallata especially towards the anterior margin, veins 
brown: stigma not conspicuous. Halteres brownish.

Female. Eyes sparingly and very short hairy. Frons broad, black. Thorax with brown pubescence. Abdomen not brown at the base: wings nearly as brown as in the male.

Biology
The habitat is wetland and flowing water locations with trees and shrubs. Adults are found from April to September.The larvae are found in wet moss.

Distribution
Austria, Belgium, Bulgaria, Czech Republic, Denmark, Finland, England, Estonia, Finland, France, Georgia, Germany, Hungary, Iceland, Ireland, Italy, Latvia, Lithuania, Netherlands, Norway, Poland, Romania, Russia, Slovakia, Spain, Sweden, Switzerland, Ukraine

References

Stratiomyidae
Diptera of Europe
Insects described in 1767
Taxa named by Carl Linnaeus